The Antena de Oro awards, created in 1962, are awarded annually by the Federation of Radio and Television Associations of Spain to the most outstanding professionals in the field of the audiovisual industry. The jury that decides the awards is made up of the professionals themselves. The sculptor of the award is Nacho Martin.

References

Spanish television awards
Awards established in 1962